Matthias Schranner (born 4 January 1964) is a consultant and ex-hostage negotiator, who worked for the German police. He is CEO and founder of the Schranner Negotiation Institute in Switzerland, and of Schranner Negotiation LLC in the United States. He is the author of the books Negotiations on the Edge and Costly Mistakes, as well as an adjunct professor at the University of St. Gallen and the University of Warwick.

Career 
Schranner grew up in Germany and graduated from the University of Munich with a Master of Law.

Schranner started his career with the German police where he worked for 17 years. After 6 years of working undercover in drug enforcement, he was trained by the FBI and transferred to a special Federal Criminal Task Force for the Bundesministerium des Innern. He was responsible for overseeing crimes such as kidnappings and hostage situations.

After his career in Law Enforcement, Schranner founded the Schranner Negotiation Institute and later Schranner Negotiation LLC. He has consulted Fortune 500 companies, political parties and government leaders, as well as the United Nations.

Selected publications 
 Negotiations on the Edge (2011), 
 Costly Mistakes: The 7 Biggest Errors in Negotiations (2008),

References

External links 
Official Website

1964 births
Living people
Ludwig Maximilian University of Munich alumni
German male writers
German police officers
Hostage negotiators
People from Freising (district)